The Buratha mosque bombing was a triple suicide bombing that occurred on April 7, 2006, in Baghdad. The attack killed 85 people and wounded 160 others.

The attacks
As worshippers were leaving the Buratha Mosque, a key Shia mosque in Baghdad, after Friday prayers, one of three suicide bombers, two out of the three were dressed as women, detonated himself after passing through the women's security checkpoint, and entering the mosque. The second suicide bomber detonated inside the courtyard of the mosque and the third bomber detonated inside the office of Sheikh Jalaluddin al-Saghir, a member of the Iraqi parliament, in an attempt to assassinate him. However, al-Saghir was unharmed in the attack.

In the end the three bombers managed to kill 85 people, and injure 160.

References

External links

Dozens die in Iraq mosque attack BBC News

2006 murders in Iraq
2000s in Baghdad
21st-century mass murder in Iraq
April 2006 events in Iraq
Attacks on religious buildings and structures in Iraq
Attacks on Shiite mosques
Building bombings in Iraq
Crime in Baghdad
Explosions in 2006
Mass murder in 2006
Suicide bombings in Iraq
Terrorist incidents in Iraq in 2006
Terrorist incidents in Baghdad
Violence against Shia Muslims in Iraq